Nasutoceratops is an extinct genus of ceratopsian dinosaur. It is a basal centrosaurine which lived during the Late Cretaceous Period (late Campanian, about 76.0-75.5 Ma). Fossils have been found in southern Utah, United States. Nasutoceratops was a large, ground-dwelling, quadrupedal herbivore with a short snout and unique rounded horns above its eyes that have been likened to those of modern cattle. Extending almost to the tip of its snout, these horns are the longest of all the members of the centrosaurine subfamily. The presence of pneumatic elements in the nasal bones of Nasutoceratops are a unique trait and are unknown in any other ceratopsid.

Discovery and naming 

Nasutoceratops is known from the holotype UMNH VP 16800, a partially associated nearly complete skull, a coronoid process, a syncervical, three partial anterior dorsal vertebrae, a shoulder girdle, an associated left forelimb, parts of the right forelimb and skin impressions. Two specimens were referred: UMNH VP 19466, a disarticulated adult skull consisting of an incomplete premaxilla, maxilla and nasal, and UMNH VP 19469, an isolated squamosal of a subadult. The holotype was discovered and collected in 2006 during the Kaiparowits Basin Project, initiated by the University of Utah in 2000. It was recovered from channel sandstone from the middle unit of the upper Kaiparowits Formation within the Grand Staircase–Escalante National Monument, in sediment that dates to the late Campanian stage of the Cretaceous period, approximately 75 million years ago.

It was first named and described in a thesis by its discoverer Eric Karl Lund in 2010 as Nasutuceratops titusi, remaining at first an invalid nomen ex dissertatione. Scott D. Sampson, Lund, Mark A. Loewen, Andrew A. Farke and Katherine E. Clayton validly named it in 2013, emending the generic name to Nasutoceratops. The type species is Nasutoceratops titusi. The generic name comes from nasutus in Latin meaning "large-nosed", and ceratops, "horned-face" in Greek. The specific name honors Alan L. Titus for recovering fossils of Nasutoceratops from the GSENM.

Description
 
Nasutoceratops has several unique derived traits or autapomorphies. The part of the snout around the nostril is strongly developed, representing about three quarters of the skull length in front of the eye sockets. The rear of each nasal bone is hollowed out by a large internal cavity. The contact surface between the maxilla and the praemaxilla is exceptionally large. The maxilla also has a large internal flange contacting the praemaxilla via two horizontal facets. The brow horns at their bases are pointed forwards and outwards, then curve inwards, and ultimately twist their points upwards.
 
Nasutoceratops also shows a unique combination of traits that are in themselves not unique. The horn on the nose is low and narrow, with an elongated base. The squamosal has a high ridge on its upper surface, running from the direction of the eye socket towards the squamosal rim. The skull frill is more or less circular with its widest point at the middle edge. The osteoderms on the frill edge, the epiparietals and episquamosals, do not have the form of spikes but are shaped like simple low crescents. The rear frill edge is not notched but instead has an epiparietal on the midline.

The snout of Nasutoceratops was short and high; its nasal bones exhibit internal cavities that the authors consider to represent pneumatic excavations, invading the bone from the nasal cavity.  This is noteworthy because pneumatic nasals are unknown in any other ceratopsid, which supports that this feature represents a unique derived trait of this genus. Nasutoceratops had as many as 29 tooth positions in the maxilla, each occupied by several stacked teeth. The skull roof between the eye sockets is vaulted and is markedly higher than the snout region. The curved horizontally projecting brow horn arrangement was likened to that of modern cattle by paleontologist David Hone. The brow horns span approximately 40% of the total length of the skull, almost reaching the level of the snout tip, and with a bone core length of up to 457 millimetres are the longest known of any centrosaurine, both in absolute and relative terms.

The skull frill is moderately long, and pierced by a large kidney-shaped parietal fenestra at each side. Apart from the midline epiparietal, there are seven epiparietals at each side, and about four to five episquamosals. In the forelimb, the ulna is exceptionally robust with a large olecranon process. Of the three patches with skin impressions found near the left shoulder, one shows a pattern of large, eight to eleven millimetres wide, hexagonal scales surrounded by smaller triangular scales.

Classification
Nasutoceratops was assigned to the Centrosaurinae in 2013, in a relatively basal position. A phylogenetic analysis performed by Sampson et al. (2013) found Nasutoceratops to be the sister taxon of Avaceratops. According to this study, the existence of Nasutoceratops would support the hypothesis of faunal separation between the north and south of Laramidia. Its clade would differ from the northern centrosaurines in the retention of long brow horns and a short nose horn, combined with developing, convergent with the Chasmosaurinae, low epiparietals. In 2016, this clade was named Nasutoceratopsini; it contains Nasutoceratops as well as ANSP 15800 (the holotype of Avaceratops), MOR 692 (previously treated as an adult specimen of Avaceratops), the newly described CMN 8804 from the Oldman Formation, and another undescribed ceratopsian found in Malta, Montana. The cladogram presented below follows a phylogenetic analysis of the Centrosaurinae by Chiba et al. (2017), which included a systematic re-evaluation of Medusaceratops lokii:

Paleoecology

The only known specimen of Nasutoceratops was recovered at the Kaiparowits Formation, in southern Utah. Argon-argon radiometric dating indicates that the Kaiparowits Formation was deposited between 76.1 and 74.0 million years ago, during the Campanian stage of the Late Cretaceous period. During the Late Cretaceous period, the site of the Kaiparowits Formation was located near the western shore of the Western Interior Seaway, a large inland sea that split North America into two landmasses, Laramidia to the west and Appalachia to the east. The plateau where dinosaurs lived was an ancient floodplain dominated by large channels and abundant wetland peat swamps, ponds and lakes, and was bordered by highlands. The climate was wet and humid, and supported an abundant and diverse range of organisms. This formation contains one of the best and most continuous records of Late Cretaceous terrestrial life in the world.

Nasutoceratops shared its paleoenvironment with theropods such as dromaeosaurids, the troodontid Talos sampsoni, ornithomimids like Ornithomimus velox, tyrannosaurids like Teratophoneus, armored ankylosaurids, the duckbilled hadrosaurs Parasaurolophus cyrtocristatus and Gryposaurus monumentensis, the ceratopsians Utahceratops gettyi and Kosmoceratops richardsoni and the oviraptorosaurian Hagryphus giganteus. Paleofauna present in the Kaiparowits Formation included chondrichthyans (sharks and rays), frogs, salamanders, turtles, lizards and crocodilians.  A variety of early mammals were present including multituberculates, marsupials, and insectivorans.

See also

 Timeline of ceratopsian research

References

External links

Image

Centrosaurines
Late Cretaceous dinosaurs of North America
Fossil taxa described in 2013
Taxa named by Scott D. Sampson
Paleontology in Utah
Kaiparowits Formation
Campanian genus first appearances
Campanian genus extinctions
Ornithischian genera